Belinda "Bella" Ajoke Olubunmi Disu (née Adenuga, born 29 May 1986) is a Nigerian businesswoman. She is Chairman, Board of Directors Abumet Nigeria Limited, Executive Vice Chairman of Globacom, CEO of Cobblestone Properties and Estates Limited, and a non-executive director of Julius Berger Nigeria Plc

Early life and education
Bella was born on 29 May 1986 to Emelia Adefolake Marquis, a Nigerian entrepreneur and Mike Adenuga, the chairman of Globacom. She was educated in Lagos, first at Corona School, Victoria Island and then at Queen's College for her secondary education. In 1998, she left Queen's College for the Vivian Fowler Memorial College for Girls, where she graduated in 2000.

She obtained a bachelor's degree in Political Science and International Relations from the University of Massachusetts, Boston, US and an M.Sc in Leadership from Northeastern University, Boston.

Career
In 2004, Bella joined Globacom Ltd, a multinational telecommunications company operating in Ghana and Nigeria, and is now the group executive director.

In 2011, she took on an additional role of group executive director of Cobblestone Properties and Estates Limited to become CEO in 2015.
She is a non-executive director of a Nigerian construction company, Julius Berger Nigeria Plc, and a director at Abumet Plc, a glass and aluminium manufacturing company, also in Nigeria.In January 2019, she assumed the role of executive vice chairman of Globacom after joining the firm in 2004. She attended the Africa CEO Forum that year, where she had a private meeting with President Paul Kagame of Rwanda. She was also a keynote speaker for the Women in Business Initiative of the Africa CEO Forum. and she joined 149 other global business leaders like Aliko Dangote, Jim Ovia and Tony Elumelu at the 2019 Choose France International Business Summit held at the Chateau de Versailles in France. At the summit, she announced a deal with Nokia Alcatel-Lucent, to supply, install, and integrate a new Sure Pay Intelligent Network platform.
On the 31st of October 2019, as Executive Director of Cobblestone properties, she unveiled a 10-storey luxury apartments at Bourdillon, Ikoyi, Lagos State which is called 'Sisi Paris'.

In 2021, she was appointed Chairman, Board of Directors of Abumet Nigeria Limited.

Bella is a member of the Nigerian Institute of Directors and the Nigerian Institute of Management.

Personal life
In April 2010, she married Jameel Disu, a venture capitalist, and they have two children.

Philanthropy
Disu is the founder and president of Bella Disu Foundation, a nonprofit organization which says it aims to help less privileged children by providing education and employment skills.
She is a promoter of the French language and culture through the Alliance Française Project at the Mike Adenuga Alliance Française Centre in Ikoyi, Lagos State.
She is listed as a "benefactor" of music by the Musical Society of Nigeria (MUSON) Wall of Fame for her contributions in encouraging a better environment for musical learning.
Bella Disu, representing the Mike Adenuga Foundation (MAF), donated N1.5 billion to Federal Government and Lagos State government to support Nigeria's fight against the global Coronavirus pandemic (COVID-19).

Awards and recognition
Bella was awarded the Ordre des Arts et des Lettres by the French government in December 2019, for her contributions on preservation of arts and culture especially her coordination of the construction of the Alliance Francaise Mike Adenuga Centre, Ikoyi, Lagos.

References

External links

Nigerian women business executives
1986 births
Living people
Queen's College, Lagos alumni
University of Massachusetts Boston alumni
Businesspeople from Lagos
Nigerian philanthropists
Nigerian real estate businesspeople
Businesspeople in telecommunications
21st-century Nigerian businesswomen
21st-century Nigerian businesspeople
Vivian Fowler Memorial College for Girls alumni
Recipients of the Ordre des Arts et des Lettres
Northeastern University alumni
Nigerian expatriates in the United States
Nigerian corporate directors
Women corporate directors